Marcus Olsson (born 25 September 1986) is a Swedish professional ice hockey centre playing for Rungsted Seier Capital of the Metal Ligaen. He was previously signed by Austrian club, HC TWK Innsbruck of the EBEL to a one-year contract on April 25, 2014. He returned to EBEL after playing completing his second stint with youth club  Malmö Redhawks in Swedish HockeyAllsvenskan. On July 16, 2015, Olsson left the Austrian league as a free agent and signed his first contract in Denmark with Frederikshavn White Hawks of the Metal Ligaen.

References

External links

1986 births
HK Acroni Jesenice players
HC TWK Innsbruck players
Living people
Malmö Redhawks players
Sparta Warriors players
Swedish ice hockey centres
Vienna Capitals players
People from Trelleborg
Sportspeople from Skåne County